Grasse Cathedral, now the Church of Notre-Dame-du-Puy, is a 12th-century Roman Catholic church located in Grasse, Alpes-Maritimes, France. The former cathedral is in the Romanesque architectural style, and is a national monument.

As a cathedral it was the seat of the Bishop of Grasse. The diocese of Grasse was abolished under the Concordat of 1801 and since then the building has been a parish church.

References

Sources
Jacques Thirion: Romanik der Côte d'Azur und der Seealpen, pp. 211–221. Echter Verlag: Würzburg

External links

Location

Former cathedrals in France
Churches in Alpes-Maritimes
Grasse